Lasiopetalum floribundum, commonly known as free flowering lasiopetalum, is a species of flowering plant in the family Malvaceae and is endemic to the south-west of Western Australia. It is an erect or spreading shrub with hairy young stems, egg-shaped leaves and pale pink, mauve or white flowers.

Description
Flowering occurs from September to December.

Taxonomy
Lasiopetalum floribundum was first formally described in 1863 by George Bentham in Flora Australiensis. In 2017, Kelly Anne Shepherd and Carolyn F. Wilkins designated the specimens collected by James Drummond in the Swan River Colony as the lectotype. The specific epithet (floribundum) means "flowering profusely".

Distribution and habitat
This lasiopetalum grows in forest, usually in river valleys and near creeks from near the Canning Dam to West Cape Howe National Park in the Avon Wheatbelt, Jarrah Forest, Swan Coastal Plain and Warren biogeographic regions of south-western Western Australia.

Conservation status
Lasiopetalum floribundum is listed as "not threatened" by the Government of Western Australia Department of Biodiversity, Conservation and Attractions.

References

floribundum
Malvales of Australia
Rosids of Western Australia
Plants described in 1863
Taxa named by George Bentham